The 2007 Edo State gubernatorial election held on 14 April 2007 was the 4th gubernatorial election of Edo State. The Peoples Democratic Party nominee Oserheimen Osunbor won the election with 329,740 votes, defeating Adams Oshiomole of the Action Congress of Nigeria with 197,472 votes.

Results 
Oserheimen Osunbor from the People's Democratic Party won the election, defeating Adams Oshiomole from the Action Congress of Nigeria. Registered voters was 1,345,410.

References 

Edo State gubernatorial elections
Edo gubernatorial
April 2007 events in Nigeria